Elizabeth Grey, 6th Baroness Lisle (c.1482/1484 – c.1525/1526) was an English noblewoman during the reigns of Henry VII and VIII.

Origins

Elizabeth Grey was the daughter of Edward Grey, 1st Viscount Lisle (d. 1492) by his wife  Elizabeth Talbot (d. 1487), daughter and eventual heir of John Talbot, 1st Viscount Lisle (1423–1453).

Marriages
Elizabeth married two times:
 Firstly to Edmund Dudley (c. 1462-1510); they had three children: 
John Dudley, 1st Duke of Northumberland (c. 1502-1553)  
Andrew Dudley
Jerome Dudley 
Secondly, after the execution of Edmund Dudley, Elizabeth married Arthur Plantagenet (d. 1542). Arthur and Elizabeth had three daughters: 
Frances Plantagenet
Elizabeth Plantagenet
Bridget Plantagenet.

Succession to Barony of Lisle
On the death of her niece Elizabeth Grey, Viscountess Lisle (1505–1519), the daughter of her brother John Grey, 2nd Viscount Lisle (1481–1504) by his wife Muriel Howard, the barony of Lisle passed to Elizabeth, who thereby became suo jure Baroness Lisle. Her husband Arthur Plantagenet was created Viscount Lisle on 25 April 1523. He continued to hold the title after her death in 1525 or 1526. After Arthur Plantagenet's death in 1542, Henry VIII granted the viscountcy to Elizabeth Grey's eldest son by her first marriage, John Dudley, 1st Viscount Lisle, "by the right of his mother". He was created Viscount Lisle on 12 March 1542, and was later created Duke of Northumberland. He forfeited his titles upon his execution and attainder in 1553.

Notes

References
Grummitt, David (2008), "Plantagenet, Arthur, Viscount Lisle (b. before 1472, d. 1542)", Oxford Dictionary of National Biography. doi:10.1093/ref:odnb/22355 

Year of birth uncertain
English viscountesses
English baronesses
Daughters of viscounts
Hereditary women peers
1480s births
1529 deaths
Barons Lisle (Peerage of England)
Wives of knights